Emrax d.o.o is a Slovenian electric aircraft engine manufacturer founded by Roman Sušnik and based in Kamnik. The company specializes in the design and manufacture of electric motors for light aircraft.

The company was founded in 2008 as Enstroj, to produce the Emrax line of engines, but the company name was later changed to Emrax. Initially located in Radomlje, the company was relocated to Kamnik.

The company is organized as a družba z omejeno odgovornostjo, a Slovenian private Limited Liability Company.

History
Sušnik conducted the first electric-powered aircraft flight in Slovenia and the third worldwide in 2005, but experienced an engine failure due to the design limitations of the commercial motor he used.  This led him to develop his own line of engines, the EMRAX (Electric Motor Roman Axial fluX) in 2008. This axial flux design became the basis for the production designs, built in different sizes and voltages for a range of aircraft installations.

Aircraft 
Summary of aircraft engines built by Emrax:

Emrax 2
Emrax 207
Emrax 228
Emrax 268

References

External links

Aircraft engine manufacturers of Slovenia
Electric aircraft